Paul Newton (born 21 February 1948, Andover, Hampshire, England) is an English rock musician. He was bassist with progressive group Shinn, which featured organist Don Shinn and drummer Brian "Blinky" Davison, and then joined a reformed line-up of The Gods with Ken Hensley and Lee Kerslake. He was the original bass guitarist for Uriah Heep and played on the band's first three albums. He subsequently played for a band called Festival for several years on the Mecca Palais circuit and also worked as a studio musician and appeared on various recordings. More recently he has performed with other ex-members of Uriah Heep (Ken Hensley, John Lawton and Lee Kerslake) in Uriah Heep Legends. He has appeared with Behind Closed Doors, a band formed by his son, Julian. Now works occasionally with Bromyard band The Business and Off the Cuff with long time friend, guitarist Dave Beale. He, along with John Lawton, guested on three songs with Uriah Heep at the Masters of Rock Festival in the Czech Republic on 11 July 2019, making this the first time he has played with the band since 1971.

Discography
 1970 - Uriah Heep - Very 'eavy... Very 'umble
 1971 – Uriah Heep - Salisbury
 1971 – Uriah Heep - Look at Yourself
 2001 - With The Hensley Lawton Band - The Return
 2016 - Chris Rainbow - Licence to Rock
 2016 - Twisted Tapestry (Bass on some tracks on EP)

References

External links
Paul Newton at The Milarus Mansion

1948 births
Living people
English rock bass guitarists
Male bass guitarists
Uriah Heep (band) members
People from Andover, Hampshire
The Gods (band) members